Yo La Tengo Is Murdering the Classics is an album by the band Yo La Tengo, released in 2006, consisting solely of covers.

Yo La Tengo supported the fundraising efforts of independent radio channel WFMU with annual studio visits. All listeners who pledged money during the band's appearances were offered the chance to request a favorite song that the band would then attempt to perform. This album compiles more than two dozen WFMU highlights first broadcast between 1996 and 2003.

The album cover was created by cartoonist Adrian Tomine.

Track listing

Personnel
Georgia Hubley – vocals, drums, keyboards
Ira Kaplan – vocals, guitar, keyboards
James McNew – vocals, bass
Bruce Bennett – guitar, vocals

References 

Covers albums
2006 compilation albums
Yo La Tengo albums